Bader Al-Shahrani (born 14 November 1989) is a Saudi professional footballer who plays as a winger.

Honours
Al-Wehda
Prince Mohammad bin Salman League: 2017–18

External links

References

1989 births
Living people
Saudi Arabian footballers
Sportspeople from Riyadh
Association football wingers
Al Nassr FC players
Al-Riyadh SC players
Al-Wehda Club (Mecca) players
Najran SC players
Saudi First Division League players
Saudi Professional League players